Canal Street is a major thoroughfare in the city of New Orleans. Forming the upriver boundary of the city's oldest neighborhood, the French Quarter or Vieux Carré, it served historically as the dividing line between the colonial-era (18th-century) city and the newer American Sector, today's Central Business District. 

Up until the early 1800s, it was the Creoles who lived in the Vieux Carré. After the Louisiana Purchase (1803), a large influx of other cultures began to find their way into the city via the Mississippi River. A number of Americans from Kentucky and the Midwest moved into the city and settled uptown. Along the division between these two cultures, a canal was planned. The canal was never built but the street which took its place received the name.  Furthermore, the median of the street became known as the neutral ground, acknowledging the cultural divide. To this day, all medians of New Orleans streets are called neutral grounds.

One end of Canal Street terminates at the Mississippi River. Often called "the foot of Canal Street", at the riverfront the Canal Street Ferry offers a connection to the Algiers Point neighborhood, an older, 18th-century portion of the larger Algiers section of New Orleans. Canal Street's other terminus is in Mid-City at a collection of cemeteries. Slightly offset from the Mid-City end is the beginning of Canal Boulevard, which extends to the shore of Lake Pontchartrain via the Lakeview neighborhood.  Throughout its length, Canal, which runs east and west, serves as a dividing line for cross streets running north and south; although the New Orleans layout follows the Mississippi River.

The street has three lanes of traffic in both directions, with a pair of streetcar tracks in the center. Canal Street's downtown segment serves as the hub of the city's public transit system or RTA, with numerous streetcar and bus route terminals.  (Of note, it is the home of the Canal Streetcar Line, operated by the RTA.)

Canal Street is often said to be the widest roadway in America to have been called a street, instead of the avenue or boulevard titles more typically appended to wide urban thoroughfares.

Shopping

For more than a century, Canal Street was the main shopping district of Greater New Orleans. Local or regional department stores Maison Blanche, D. H. Holmes, Godchaux's, Gus Mayer, Labiche's, Kreeger's, and Krauss anchored numerous well-known specialty retailers, such as Rubenstein Men's Store, Adler's Jewelry, Koslow's, Rapp's, and Werlein's Music, as well as bookstores, drugstores, Kress, Woolworth's, and others. The department stores began as sellers of fabric, notions, and accessories, with extensive floor space and glass windows. As elevators and escalators allowed for multi-floor department stores, the stores were enlarged and made more elegant by incorporating adjoining buildings.

Although Canal Street began to lose its primacy as a regional shopping destination in the late 1960s, it retained a robust mix of department stores and specialty shopping into the mid-1980s — somewhat later than main-street shopping districts in other U.S. cities — and it received a boost in 1983 with the completion of Canal Place's retail component. However, national trends disfavoring downtown retail finally caught up with Canal Street — with a key assist from the regional economic depression of the mid-80s (the Oil Bust).

One Canal Place has three lower levels which are occupied by The Shops at Canal Place. The mall contains a Saks Fifth Avenue, the Theatres at Canal Place, a food court, and approximately 45 high-end retailers including Anthropologie, Brooks Brothers, Michael Kors, and Morton's the Steakhouse. In the aftermath of Hurricane Katrina, a fire inflicted heavy damage to the Saks Fifth Avenue store. The mall reopened in February 2006, and a completely-remodeled Saks reopened in November.

One Canal Place Office Tower is a Class A commercial office building managed by Corporate Realty. It is adjacent to the Westin New Orleans Hotel.

Entertainment

New Orleans has historically been a center for opera, theatre, and concerts. In 1871 the Varieties Theater opened on Canal Street between Dauphine and Burgundy streets. The building was renovated and renamed the Grand Opera House in 1881, which could be used as both a theater and ballroom. Theaters and movie houses were clustered around the intersection with Rampart Street, with the neon marquees of the Saenger, Loews State, Orpheum, and Joy casting multi-colored light nightly onto surrounding sidewalks.

It is said that the world's first movie theater (that is, the first business devoted specifically to showing films for profit) was "Vitascope Hall", established on Canal Street in 1896. By the 1910s there were several movie theaters on Canal, including the Alamo, the Plaza, and the Dreamworld. In 1912 the Trianon, the first "movie palace" in the city opened. The Tudor followed in 1914 and the Globe in 1918. By the 1950s they had become low-grade theaters, and in the 1960s they were closed.

Although most of the grand movie theaters have closed over the years, several cinemas on Canal Street operate today.

Hotels

In the 1830s, several hotels on Canal Street near the river were in operation, including the Union Hotel and the Planters Hotel. Although most of the grand 19th-century hotels were located in the French Quarter, the Perry House was on Canal Street. By the 1920s a growth was seen in the number of hotels on Canal Street. These included the LaSalle Hotel, the Hotel New Orleans, and the Jung Hotel with its rooftop ballroom. As convention industry began to grow in the 1960s, the Governor House Motor Hotel and the International Hotel were built. Almost a whole block was taken up by the Marriott Hotel which opened in 1972 as the tallest hotel in the city.  Canal Street began to accommodate large convention hotels, such as the Sheraton New Orleans and the JW Marriott. The emergence of new hotels has since slowed, but continued operation of many on Canal Street indicate the sustained importance of the street in both business and entertainment. (See Redevelopment section below, for additional Canal Street hotels.)

Two of Canal Street's former department stores are now hotels. D. H. Holmes has become the Hyatt Centric French Quarter Hotel, and the former Maison Blanche store is now the New Orleans Ritz-Carlton Hotel. Both are on the French Quarter side of Canal.

At least two other high-rise hotels are just off Canal Street, the Roosevelt in the Central Business District (CBD) and the Monteleone in the French Quarter. In the 19th century, the St. Charles Hotel on St. Charles Avenue was another icon of the CBD.

Redevelopment

Both business and government leaders in New Orleans have taken steps over the past 50 years to encourage development and corporate centered business in the city. These began with the construction of the Superdome using public money, choosing not to build an expressway along the Mississippi River in the French Quarter and allowing the riverfront to be developed for tourism, and the under used wharves made available by the New Orleans public port authority for non-maritime use in the 1960s.  These decisions opened the door for changes in land use, encouraging business, especially that of the tourism industry, for the city. 
The downtown New Orleans segment of Canal Street has been undergoing redevelopment along the lines called for in the Downtown Development District's Canal Street Vision and Development Strategy (2004). In recent years the street has welcomed the addition of numerous new anchor enterprises, including the Ritz-Carlton New Orleans, luxury apartments at 1201 Canal, the New Orleans Bio-Innovation Center, the rehabilitated Joy Theater, the Saint Hotel, the Audubon Nature Institute's Audubon Insectarium, and the Astor Crowne Plaza. In October 2011, the New Orleans City Council granted final approval for the construction of 1031 Canal, a 190-foot (58 m) multi-use high-rise at the northeast intersection of Canal and North Rampart Streets. The building, under construction as a Hard Rock Hotel, was the site of a partial building and crane collapse on October 12, 2019.

After exiting downtown, Canal Street runs for its remaining length through the Mid-City neighborhood, part of which is now designated as BioDistrict New Orleans, a state-chartered economic development district created to encourage growth in the region's biomedical sector. Construction of two new teaching hospitals, the University Medical Center and a U.S. Department of Veterans Affairs regional facility, involving the expenditure of approximately $2 billion, is now underway in the BioDistrict.

See also
 Downtown New Orleans
 French Quarter
 Central Business District
 Streetcars in New Orleans
 List of streets of New Orleans

Further reading
 Canal Street: New Orleans' Great Wide Way by Peggy Scott Laborde and John Magill, Pelican Publishing, 2006.

References

Streets in New Orleans
Economy of New Orleans
Downtown New Orleans